Kousalya Krishnamurthy is a 2019 Indian Telugu-language sports drama film, produced by K. A. Vallabha under the Creative Commercials banner and directed by Bhimaneni Srinivasa Rao. The film stars Aishwarya Rajesh, Rajendra Prasad, Karthik Raju and Sivakarthikeyan in a supporting role, with music composed by Dhibu Ninan Thomas. This film is a remake of the 2018 Tamil film Kanaa and marks the Telugu debut of Aishwarya Rajesh. The film reused scenes involving Sivakarthikeyan from the original film. The film was released theatrically on 23 August 2019.

Plot 
Kousalya Krishnamurthy, the daughter of Krishnamurthy, a farmer, is highly fascinated by cricket. In her childhood, Kousalya saw tears in her father's eyes when India suffered defeat in the 2007 Cricket World Cup. Hence, she determines to become an international cricketer to get back the smile on her cricket-loving father's face. At the age of 11, she joins the local cricket team in the village who are mostly her school seniors when everyone appreciates her talent for off-spin technique getting wickets. She also earns the wrath of many villagers for playing cricket with boys, which Krishnamurthy does not care about and supports his daughter. At present, Kousalya appears for team selections. She gets rejected but does not give up. She works hard and gets selected for the [India women's national cricket team|Indian women’s cricket team]. Kousalya moves for training at National Cricket Academy Bangalore, where she is humiliated by seniors due to internal politics, and even the coach demotes her to a large extent. However, the entry of a new coach named Nelson Dilipkumar, an ex-Indian cricketer, develops the team’s spirit and gets the players ready for the upcoming T20 world cup. Nelson discovers the spin bowling capabilities of Kousalya and trains her on the right path. He also locks horns with the committee and ensures Kousalya’s presence in the world cup. Meanwhile, Krishnamurthy faces a tough time with agriculture and is unable to repay the debt of the bank and ends up being in a rift with the bank manager. At one point, Nelson decides to rest Kousalya for the league matches as a strategy to hide her talent and give a surprise to opponents, which brings her down. Ultimately, Kousalya is selected for the semifinal against the strongest team, Australia. At the same time, Krishnamurthy’s house is auctioned by the bank; hearing it, Kousalya becomes anguished when Nelson motivates her to make her father proud by winning the match. During the match, Kousalya bowls a hat-trick and again bowls well leading to India’s win. At last, she is declared as Woman of the Match, awarded Rs. 5 lakhs (from the same bank which was auctioning her house) when she gives an emotional speech describing the situation of farmers in the country. Finally, Krishnamurthy feels proud of his daughter.

Cast

 Aishwarya Rajesh as Kousalya Krishnamurthy
 Rajendra Prasad as Krishnamurthy 
 Karthik Raju as Sai
 Sivakarthikeyan as Nelson Dhilipkumar 
 Jhansi as Savitri, Kousalya's mother
 Vennela Kishore as Inspector Balram
 Bhimaneni Srinivasa Rao as Bank manager
 Ravi Prakash as School P. E. T. Master
 C. V. L. Narasimha Rao as Dhanakrishna
 Kali Prasad Mukherjee as Patel
 "Rangasthalam" Mahesh as Sachin
 "Taxiwala" Vishnu as Tendulkar
 Natasha Parashar as Natasha Parashar
 Nirali Oza as Gayathri Dixit
 Shyla Alam as Anjali Sharma
 Sushree Pradhan as Deepika Patel
 Ramya Justin as Ramya
 Sajana Sajeevan as Sajana

Production
K. S. Rama Rao, the presenter of the film, saw the trailer of Kanaa on the sets of World Famous Lover and decided to remake it in Telugu. The remake, titled Kousalya Krishnamurthy, was shot in the surrounding areas of Rajahmundry.

Release
The film was released theatrically on 23 August 2019.

Soundtrack 

The film's soundtrack was composed by Dhibu Ninan Thomas, who composed the original film. All of the film's tunes were reused from Kanaa.

Reception

Critical reception 

123telugu gave 3 out of 5 stars stating "An emotional sports drama which has some good moments. Decent family emotions and some interesting cricketing scenes are basic assets. On the flip side, the lengthy runtime, predictable sports-based storyline play spoilsport. If you are okay with these small issues, you can easily give this inspiring film a shot".

The Times of India gave 2.5 out of 5 stars stating "An emotional drama centred around cricket. We've seen a lot of Tollywood films based on cricket in recent times, but Kousalya Krishnamurthy has more cricket in it than an actual story".

The Deccan Chronicle gave 2.5 out of 5 stars stating "Kousalya Krishnamurthy has a thought-provoking subject but its clichéd presentation detracts from the film".

References

External links
 

2010s Telugu-language films
2010s sports drama films
2019 films
Indian sports drama films
Films about cricket in India
Films about social issues in India
Films about women in India
Films about women's sports
Films shot in Andhra Pradesh
Films set in Karnataka
Indian feminist films
2010s coming-of-age films
Indian nonlinear narrative films
Telugu remakes of Tamil films
2010s feminist films
Films directed by Bhimaneni Srinivasa Rao
2019 drama films
Films shot in Rajahmundry
Films about farmers' suicides in India